The 2015 Memphis Tigers baseball team represents the University of Memphis during the 2015 NCAA Division I baseball season. The Tigers play their home games at FedExPark as a member of the American Athletic Conference. They are led by head coach Daron Schoenrock, in his tenth season at Memphis.

Previous season
In 2014, the Tigers finished the season 8th in the American Athletic Conference with a record of 30–29, 8–16 in conference play. They qualified for the 2014 American Athletic Conference baseball tournament, but failed to qualify for the 2014 NCAA Division I baseball tournament.

Personnel

Roster

Coaching staff

Season

February
The Tigers opened their season on February 13 against  on the road in Tulsa, Oklahoma. Over the three game series, the Tigers went 1–2, losing the first two games before rebounding to win the third game of their season, 6–1. A series of weather-related cancellations changed Memphis' schedule over the next week. The Tigers' home opener against  was then pushed back until the end of April.

To end the month of February (and open March), the Tigers hosted , the three time defending Atlantic 10 regular season champions. The series opened with a doubleheader, in which Memphis won the first game in ten innings after a walk-off home run by Tucker Tubbs, while Saint Louis won the second game. In the third and final game of the series, Memphis won 5–2 in a game that was shortened to seven innings due to rain.

Schedule

! style="background:#000080;color:white;"| Regular Season
|- valign="top" 

|- bgcolor="#ffbbbb"
| February 13 || at  ||  || J. L. Johnson Stadium • Tulsa, OK || L 1–3 || Garza (1–0) || Hathcock (0–1) || Stout (1) || 506 || 0–1 || –
|- bgcolor="#ffbbbb"
| February 14 || at Oral Roberts ||  || J. L. Johnson Stadium • Tulsa, OK  || L 3–6 || Giller (1–0) || Lee (0–1) || Stout (2) || 534 || 0–2 || –
|- bgcolor="#bbffbb"
| February 14 || at Oral Roberts ||  || J. L. Johnson Stadium • Tulsa, OK || W 6–1 || Toscano (1–0) || Altamiran (0–1) || Blackwood (1) || 534 || 1–2 || –
|- bgcolor="#bbbbbb"
| February 20 || vs.  ||  || Bear Stadium • Conway, AR || colspan=7| Cancelled 
|- bgcolor="#bbffbb"
| February 22 || at  ||  || Bear Stadium • Conway, AR || W 5–2 || Wallingford (1–0) || Gilmore (1–1) || Blackwood (2) || 292 || 2–2 || –
|- bgcolor="#bbbbbb"
| February 22 || vs. Eastern Illinois ||  || Bear Stadium • Conway, AR || colspan=7| Cancelled 
|- bgcolor="#bbbbbb"
| February 25 ||  ||  || FedExPark • Memphis, TN || colspan=7| Postponed Rescheduled for April 29
|- bgcolor="#bbffbb"
| February 28 ||  ||  || FedExPark • Memphis, TN || W 4–3 (10) || Caufield (1–0) || Shimanovsky (0–1) ||  || 552 || 3–2 || –
|- bgcolor="#ffbbbb"
| February 28 || Saint Louis ||  || FedExPark • Memphis, TN || L 2–3 || Smith (2–0) || Wallingford (1–1) || Girrens (1) || 552 || 3–3 || –
|-

|- bgcolor="#bbffbb"
| March 1 || Saint Louis ||  || FedExPark • Memphis, TN || W 5–2 (7) || Alexander (1–0) || Lehmann (0–1) || Blackwood (3) || 127 || 4–3 || –
|- bgcolor="#bbbbbb"
| March 4 || at  ||  || E. S. Rose Park • Nashville, TN || colspan=7| Postponed Rescheduled for April 6
|- bgcolor="#bbbbbb"
| March 8 ||  ||  || FedExPark • Memphis, TN || colspan=7| Cancelled
|- bgcolor="#bbbbbb"
| March 8 || Samford ||  || FedExPark • Memphis, TN || colspan=7| Cancelled
|- bgcolor="#ffbbbb"
| March 9 || Samford ||  || FedExPark • Memphis, TN || L 4–8 || Ledford (2–2) || Toscano (1–1) || Donham (1) || 116 || 4–4 || –
|- bgcolor="#bbffbb"
| March 10 ||  ||  || FedExPark • Memphis, TN || W 3–1 || Alexander (2–0) || Slatton (1–3) || Blackwood (4) || 482 || 5–4 || –
|- bgcolor="#bbffbb"
| March 11 || Middle Tennessee State ||  || FedExPark • Memphis, TN || W 11–0 || Gunn (1–0) || Troutt (0–1) ||  || 262 || 6–4 || –
|- bgcolor="#bbbbbb"
| March 13 || Eastern Illinois ||  || FedExPark • Memphis, TN || colspan=7| Postponed Rescheduled for March 14
|- bgcolor="#bbffbb"
| March 14 || Eastern Illinois ||  || FedExPark • Memphis, TN || W 6–1 || Wallingford (2–1) || Wivinis (0–3) ||  || 372 || 7–4 || –
|- bgcolor="#bbffbb"
| March 15 || Eastern Illinois ||  || FedExPark • Memphis, TN || W 11–1 || Toscano (2–1) || Stenger (0–4) ||  || 674 || 8–4 || –
|- bgcolor="#bbffbb"
| March 15 || Eastern Illinois ||  || FedExPark • Memphis, TN || W 5–2 || Caufield (2–0) || Slazinik (0–2) || Blackwood (5) || 674 || 9–4 || –
|- bgcolor="#bbffbb"
| March 17 ||  ||  || FedExPark • Memphis, TN || W 5–2 || Gunn (2–0) || Hawkins (1–4) || Blackwood (6) || 957 || 10–4 || –
|- bgcolor="#bbffbb"
| March 20 ||  ||  || FedExPark • Memphis, TN || W 6–1 || Wallingford (3–1) || Laird (1–4) ||  || 435 || 11–4 || –
|- bgcolor="#bbffbb"
| March 21 || Alcorn State ||  || FedExPark • Memphis, TN || W 17–7 || Ferguson (1–0) || Thompson (0–2) ||  || 407 || 12–4 || –
|- bgcolor="#bbffbb"
| March 21 || Alcorn State ||  || FedExPark • Memphis, TN || W 14–3 || Toscano (3–1) || Vasquez (0–1) ||  || 407 || 13–4 || –
|- bgcolor="#bbffbb"
| March 22 || Alcorn State ||  || FedExPark • Memphis, TN || W 3–1 || Alexander (3–0) || Brooks (0–3) || Blackwood (7) || 326 || 14–4 || –
|- bgcolor="#bbffbb"
| March 24 || at Arkansas ||  || Dickey-Stephens Park • North Little Rock, AR || W 5–4 || Caufield (3–0) || Phillips (0–2) ||  || 9,145 || 15–4 || –
|- bgcolor="#ffbbbb"
| March 25 || Arkansas ||  || AutoZone Park • Memphis, TN || L 3–7 || Teague (1–1) || Garner (0–1) ||  || 3,673 || 15–5 || –
|- bgcolor="#ffbbbb"
| March 27 || at East Carolina ||  || Clark–LeClair Stadium • Greenville, NC || L 1–4 || Kruczynski (5–1) || Wallingford (3–2) ||  || 2,315 || 15–6 || 0–1
|- bgcolor="#bbffbb"
| March 28 || at East Carolina ||  || Clark–LeClair Stadium • Greenville, NC || W 3–2 || Myers (1–0) || Boyd (2–7) || Blackwood (8) || 2,315 || 16–6 || 1–1
|- bgcolor="#bbffbb"
| March 29 || at East Carolina ||  || Clark–LeClair Stadium • Greenville, NC || W 4–2 || Myers (2–0) || Lucroy (2–1) || Blackwood (9) || 2,051 || 17–6 || 2–1
|- bgcolor="#ffbbbb"
| March 31 ||  ||  || AutoZone Park • Memphis, TN || L 5–7 || Denny (1–0) || Hathcock (0–1) || Short (4) || 2,962 || 17–7 || –
|-

|- bgcolor="#ffbbbb"
| April 2 || #14 Houston ||  || FedExPark • Memphis, TN || L 2–3 || Lantrip (6–2) || Wallingford (3–3) ||  || 712 || 17–8 || 2–2
|- bgcolor="#bbffbb"
| April 3 || #14 Houston ||  || FedExPark • Memphis, TN || W 14–6 || Toscano (3–1) || Dowdy (3–1) ||  || 912 || 18–8 || 3–2
|- bgcolor="#bbffbb"
| April 4 || #14 Houston ||  || FedExPark • Memphis, TN || W 6–2 || Alexander (4–0) || Romero (3–3) || Blackwood (10) || 829 || 19–8 || 4–2
|- bgcolor="#bbffbb"
| April 6 || at  ||  || E. S. Rose Park • Nashville, TN || W 11–8 || Drabik (1–0) || McGrath (3–2) || Blackwood (11) || 146 || 20–8 || –
|- bgcolor="#bbffbb"
| April 7 || Mississippi State ||  || AutoZone Park • Memphis, TN || W 7–1 || Gunn (3–0) || Sexton (3–3) ||  || 3,423 || 21–8 || –
|- align="center" bgcolor=""
| April 10 || at Cincinnati ||  || Marge Schott Stadium • Cincinnati, OH ||  ||  ||  ||  ||  ||  ||
|- align="center" bgcolor=""
| April 11 || at Cincinnati ||  || Marge Schott Stadium • Cincinnati, OH ||  ||  ||  ||  ||  ||  ||
|- align="center" bgcolor=""
| April 12 || at Cincinnati ||  || Marge Schott Stadium • Cincinnati, OH ||  ||  ||  ||  ||  ||  ||
|- align="center" bgcolor=""
| April 14 || at  ||  || Raymond C. Hand Park • Clarksville, TN ||  ||  ||  ||  ||  ||  ||
|- align="center" bgcolor=""
| April 17 || South Florida ||  || FedExPark • Memphis, TN ||  ||  ||  ||  ||  ||  ||
|- align="center" bgcolor=""
| April 18 || South Florida ||  || FedExPark • Memphis, TN ||  ||  ||  ||  ||  ||  ||
|- align="center" bgcolor=""
| April 19 || South Florida ||  || FedExPark • Memphis, TN ||  ||  ||  ||  ||  ||  ||
|- align="center" bgcolor=""
| April 21 || Belmont ||  || FedExPark • Memphis, TN ||  ||  ||  ||  ||  ||  ||
|- align="center" bgcolor=""
| April 22 || at Ole Miss ||  || Swayze Field • Oxford, MS ||  ||  ||  ||  ||  ||  ||
|- align="center" bgcolor=""
| April 24 || at Connecticut ||  || J. O. Christian Field • Storrs, CT ||  ||  ||  ||  ||  ||  ||
|- align="center" bgcolor=""
| April 25 || at Connecticut ||  || J. O. Christian Field • Storrs, CT ||  ||  ||  ||  ||  ||  ||
|- align="center" bgcolor=""
| April 26 || at Connecticut ||  || J. O. Christian Field • Storrs, CT ||  ||  ||  ||  ||  ||  ||
|- align="center" bgcolor=""
| April 28 || at Arkansas State ||  || Tomlinson Stadium • Jonesboro, AR ||  ||  ||  ||  ||  ||  ||
|- align="center" bgcolor=""
| April 29 || Mississippi Valley State ||  || FedExPark • Memphis, TN ||  ||  ||  ||  ||  ||  ||
|-

|- align="center" bgcolor=""
| May 1 || Cincinnati ||  || FedExPark • Memphis, TN ||  ||  ||  ||  ||  ||  ||
|- align="center" bgcolor=""
| May 2 || Cincinnati ||  || FedExPark • Memphis, TN ||  ||  ||  ||  ||  ||  ||
|- align="center" bgcolor=""
| May 3 || Cincinnati ||  || FedExPark • Memphis, TN ||  ||  ||  ||  ||  ||  ||
|- align="center" bgcolor=""
| May 8 || at UCF ||  || Jay Bergman Field • Orlando, FL ||  ||  ||  ||  ||  ||  ||
|- align="center" bgcolor=""
| May 9 || at UCF ||  || Jay Bergman Field • Orlando, FL ||  ||  ||  ||  ||  ||  ||
|- align="center" bgcolor=""
| May 10 || at UCF ||  || Jay Bergman Field • Orlando, FL ||  ||  ||  ||  ||  ||  ||
|- align="center" bgcolor=""
| May 12 || vs.  ||  || USA Stadium • Millington, TN ||  ||  ||  ||  ||  ||  ||
|- align="center" bgcolor=""
| May 14 || Tulane ||  || FedExPark • Memphis, TN ||  ||  ||  ||  ||  ||  ||
|- align="center" bgcolor=""
| May 15 || Tulane ||  || FedExPark • Memphis, TN ||  ||  ||  ||  ||  ||  ||
|- align="center" bgcolor=""
| May 16 || Tulane ||  || FedExPark • Memphis, TN ||  ||  ||  ||  ||  ||  ||
|-

|- 
! style="background:#000080;color:white;"| Post-Season
|-

|- align="center"
| May 20 || TBD || || Bright House Field • Clearwater, FL ||  ||  ||  ||  ||  ||  || 
|- align="center"
| May 21 || TBD || || Bright House Field • Clearwater, FL||  ||  ||  ||  ||  ||  || 
|-

|-
| style="font-size:88%"| All rankings from Collegiate Baseball.

References

Memphis Tigers
Memphis Tigers baseball seasons